Stephen Osborne (born 26 March 1963) is a Paralympian athlete from England competing in category T51 sprinting events. Osborne qualified for the 2012 Summer Paralympics in the 100m sprint. In 2014 he took the bronze medal at the European Championships in Swansea.

Personal history
Osborne was born in Longfield, England in 1963. After leaving school Osborne planned to become a carpenter, but a car accident at the age of 19 resulted in him breaking his neck.

References

External links
  (archive)

1963 births
Living people
Sportspeople from Dartford
English male sprinters
Track and field athletes with disabilities
Paralympic athletes of Great Britain
Athletes (track and field) at the 2012 Summer Paralympics
People from Longfield